Stephan Smit is a South African rugby union player for the  in the Currie Cup. His regular position is flanker.

Smit was named in the  side for the 2022 Currie Cup Premier Division.

References

South African rugby union players
Living people
Rugby union flankers
Blue Bulls players
Year of birth missing (living people)
Lions (United Rugby Championship) players
Griquas (rugby union) players